Ernie Phillips was a professional baseball pitcher in the Negro leagues. He played with the Birmingham Black Barons in 1927.

References

External links
  and Seamheads

Birmingham Black Barons players
Year of birth missing
Year of death missing
Baseball pitchers